Arratzua-Ubarrundia is a municipality located in the province of Álava, in the Basque Country, northern Spain. Its capital is the village of Durana.

Geography

Administrative subdivisions 
Arratzua-Ubarrundia is divided into 11 villages, of which 10 are organized as concejos.

References

External links
 

Municipalities in Álava